is a male Japanese badminton player from the Unisys team. He was the victor of the final match against Malaysia over Liew Daren in the 2014 Thomas Cup, which saw Japan win the tournament for the first time and in their debut final. He competed at the 2014 Asian Games.

Achievements

Summer Universiade 
Men's singles

BWF Grand Prix 
The BWF Grand Prix has two level such as Grand Prix and Grand Prix Gold. It is a series of badminton tournaments, sanctioned by Badminton World Federation (BWF) since 2007.

Men's Singles

 BWF Grand Prix Gold tournament
 BWF Grand Prix tournament

BWF International Challenge/Series
Men's doubles

 BWF International Challenge tournament
 BWF International Series tournament

References

External links
 
 

Japanese male badminton players
1989 births
Living people
Sportspeople from Tokyo Metropolis
People from Kokubunji, Tokyo
Badminton players at the 2014 Asian Games
Universiade medalists in badminton
Universiade bronze medalists for Japan
Asian Games competitors for Japan
Medalists at the 2011 Summer Universiade
21st-century Japanese people